, provisional designation , is a stony, sub-kilometer asteroid, classified as near-Earth object and potentially hazardous asteroid of the Apollo group that passed Earth within 8.2 lunar distances on 8 August 2013. It was discovered on 27 November 2005, by astronomers of the Siding Spring Survey at Siding Spring Observatory, Australia.

Description 

In August 2013,  was radar-imaged by the Deep Space Network dish at Goldstone Observatory, United States, and had been observed previously at Arecibo Observatory in July 2012 (this was not a close approach though).

Physical characteristics 

 measures approximately 250 meters in diameter, and has a rotation period of 2.595 hours. Its spectral type is that of an Sk-subtype, which transitions from the stony S-type to the uncommon K-type asteroids.

See also 
 List of asteroid close approaches to Earth in 2013

Notes

References

External links 
 Radar images
 Radar Images of Asteroid 2005 WK4, NASA news, 15 August 2013
 Optical image, virtualtelescope.eu
 Asteroid Lightcurve Database (LCDB), query form (info )
 Asteroids and comets rotation curves, CdR – Observatoire de Genève, Raoul Behrend
 
 
 

277475
277475
277475
277475
20130808
20051127